North Carolina elected its members August 13, 1829 after the term began but before Congress convened.

See also 
 1829 North Carolina's 5th congressional district special election
 1829 North Carolina's 10th congressional district special election
 1828 and 1829 United States House of Representatives elections
 List of United States representatives from North Carolina

Notes 

1829
North Carolina
United States House of Representatives